Acalolepta griseofumata is a species of beetle in the family Cerambycidae. It was described by Gressitt in 1952, originally under the genus Dihammus. It is known from the Solomon Islands.

References

Acalolepta
Beetles described in 1952